Carlos Aganza Graham - born in Hermosillo, Sonora (June 16, 1907 – April 18, 1970)  Mexican actor (known as Carlos Aganza), screenwriter, broadcaster and poet of Spanish and Scottish descent was known as the "Mexican Errol Flynn" during Mexico's Época Dorada del Cine under the name of Carlos Aganza. In the early 1940s, he was an announcer at Radio Station XECL, Mexicali, Baja California. In 1944, Carlos Graham relocated to the United States in 1944 where he became the pioneer of Spanish Language radio in the San Francisco Bay Area from the late 1940s - late 60's. His programme was on radio station KLOK. He was the host of the popular radio program Serenata Nocturnal for many years and the first Spanish-language television news anchor in Northern California. He was the uncle of the late renowned sculptor Robert Graham. He died in Santa Clara, California.

Movies of Carlos Aganza
 El Misterio del Rostro Palido (1935) [Horror; 90 minutes; Directed by Juan Bustillo Oro] - as a young Indian
Sor Juana Ines de la Cruz (1935) [82 minutes; Directed by Ramon Peon]
La Cucaracha Mexicana (1936; in color) [Directed by Juan Jose Segura] - a featured performer
Mujeres de hoy (1936) [Directed by Ramon Peon] - as Ramoncito Beltran
El Bastardo (1937) [Directed by Ramon Peon]
Don Juan Tenorio (1937) [Directed by Rene Cardona] as Don Rafael de Avellaneda
 Alla en el Rancho Chico (1938) [Comedy; Directed by Rene Cardona] - Story by Carlos Aganza and Carlos Amador

1907 births
1970 deaths
Mexican male film actors
20th-century Mexican poets
Mexican male poets
Mexican people of Scottish descent
Mexican people of Spanish descent
People from Hermosillo
20th-century Mexican male actors
20th-century Mexican male writers